The Manchester Moss Side by-election of 7 November 1961 was held after the death of Conservative Member of Parliament (MP) James Watts on 7 July that year. The seat was retained by the Conservatives.

Candidates
The local Liberals selected 37-year-old solicitor Ruslyn Hargreaves. He was born in August 1923 and educated at William Hulme's Grammar School and Manchester University. He was formerly secretary of the National League of Young Liberals. He had been Liberal candidate for Howden at the 1959 general election.  Max Mosley was an election agent for the Union Movement.

Results

References

Manchester Moss Side by-election
Manchester Moss Side by-election
Manchester Moss Side by-election
Moss Side
Moss Side by-election, 1961